Luis Felipe Soto is an American film and television director based in Los Angeles, California.

Career
The Hatillo, Puerto Rico-born Soto was nominated at CableACE Awards in 1990 as Best Dramatic Director for the HBO film The Vietnam War Story: The Last Outpost. Steve Antin, the lead actor garnered the CableACE for Best Actor.

Soto directed The House Of Ramon Iglesia for PBS's American Playhouse in 1986. The episode was written by José Rivera. The House Of Ramon Iglesia won a silver medal at The Houston Film Festival, as well as The Samuel G. Engel International Film and TV Award.

He has directed episodes for the television series The Equalizer, with Edward Woodward and Macaulay Culkin, for Universal Studios, Fame for MGM, Silk Stalkings for USA Network, Reyes y Rey for Telemundo and Silver Spoons for Columbia Pictures among others. Soto has directed commercials for, among others, AT&T, Budweiser, Pepsi, American Express, McDonald's, US Army, USPS, ARCO, and Folgers. Among his documentaries he has directed Reflections Of Our Past for PBS and Dream of Empire for National Geographic and The St. Augustine Historical Society.

Soto has served on The New York Council of the Arts as well as The Directors Guild of America Latino Committee. The Vuelva Film Festival recognized Luis for his work and invited him to head seminars and screened his films.

Soto directed at The Eugene Theater Conference in Connecticut, under the artistic direction of Lloyd Richards, then the Dean of The Yale School of Drama. He is a member of The Actors Studio, Playwrights/Directors Unit West. Soto attended the Interamerican University of Puerto Rico and graduated with a Master of Arts from the State University of New York.

Soto joined the United States Army in 1969 and was discharged in 1970 with the rank of Specialist 4. While in the Army, he served with the 101st Airborne Division in Vietnam during the Vietnam War, where he received the Purple Heart for wounds in combat. While in combat, Soto saved his fellow soldiers from a tiger attack. His actions were later memorialized in the film Apocalypse Now.

He is a member of The American Legion.

References

External links

 TCM Turner Classic Movies
 Movieweb
 Latin American & Iberian Film Collection at Dartmouth
 A Dream of Empire- National Geographic
 TV.com - The Equalizer
 TV.com - The House of Ramon Iglesia
 Yahoo TV
 Eworldwire
 Ednita: Es para ti

Film directors from Los Angeles
Interamerican University of Puerto Rico alumni
Living people
People from Hatillo, Puerto Rico
Puerto Rican film directors
State University of New York alumni
United States Army personnel of the Vietnam War
United States Army soldiers
Year of birth missing (living people)